The Kerala State Pollution Control Board is a body of the Department of Health and Family Welfare, Government of the State of Kerala, India. The board is charged with enforcing laws related to environmental protection. The Pollution Control Board has been established as a regulatory authority for implementing various pollution control laws. The board is committed to provide pollution free environment to the people of state. The Board has undertaken various studies of underground water, solid and air to take remedial steps to control pollution.

See also
Awaaz Foundation Non-governmental organisation in India, works towards preserving and enhancing environment and for other socially oriented causes.

 List of Kerala State Government Organisations

External links
Official Website
Official Website Old

1974 establishments in Kerala
Government agencies established in 1974
State pollution control boards of India
State agencies of Kerala
Environment of Kerala
Organisations based in Thiruvananthapuram